The 1967 BRSCC British Saloon Car Championship, was the tenth season of the championship. Australian Frank Gardner, driving a Ford Falcon Sprint, won the first of his three BSCC titles.

Calendar and winners
All races were held in the United Kingdom. Overall winners in bold.

Championship results

References

British Touring Car Championship seasons
Saloon